The men's triple jump event  at the 1973 European Athletics Indoor Championships was held on 10 March in Rotterdam.

Results

References

Triple jump at the European Athletics Indoor Championships
Triple